Gérard Garouste (born 10 March 1946) is a French contemporary artist having the primary field of work as visual and performative domain.

Since 1979, he has lived and worked in Marcilly-sur-Eure in Normandy, where he founded an educational and social action group to help children with art called La Source.

He has been married to designer Élisabeth Garouste since 1969.

Biography

Gérard Garouste was born in Paris. He studied at the École des Beaux-Arts de Paris from 1965 to 1972 in the atelier of Gustave Singier. It was there he discovered Duchamp. Around this time, he created several works of scenography for his friend, author and director Jean-Michel Ribes, notably for the productions of Il faut que le Sycomore coule and Jacky parady. In 1977, he presented at the Palace theater Le Classique et l'Indien, a show he wrote, directed, and decorated for. He would stay with the Palace until 1982 as a scenographer and painter.

In 1980, he had his first art show at the Durand-Dessert gallery, showing figurative, mythological, and allegorical paintings. This show brought him national recognition, and then, international. His first international show took place in New York City in 1982 at the Holly Solomon Gallery. Others followed, such as those at the Leo Castelli Gallery in New York and in Sperone, Italy. He was the only French artist to be invited to the Zeitgeist at Berlin. Institutional recognition came in 1987, at the CAPC of Bordeaux (Centre d'arts plastiques contemporains de Bordeaux), where he presented a combination of oils on canvas and acrylics on homespun, and then at the Fondation Cartier.

Garouste has executed works and decorations for various endeavors: paintings for the Élysée Palace, sculptures for Évry Cathedral, the ceiling of the theater at Namur, and for the church of Notre-Dame de Talant, stained glass. In 1989, he did the curtain for the Théâtre du Châtelet.

An important step for Garouste was the founding in 1991 of the association The Source, which sets itself the task of helping culturally underprivileged young people to achieve personal development through artistic expression.

He received an order in 1996 for a monumental work for the National Library of France mixing painting and wrought iron. Sculpture and engraving were attracting him more and more, as well as illustration for all sorts of writings, from Don Quixote to the Haggadah.

In 2001, he presented at the Fondation Cartier Ellipse, an arrangement of canvasses mounted on a construction of his own design.

Selected works

Visual arts
 La Mouche
 Ellipse at the Fondation Cartier
 Dante (195x130 cm)
 L'Antipode, oil on canvas (130x90 cm)
 Senza titolo in the "Terrae Motus" collection, at the Royal Palace of Caserta

Theater
Le Classique et l'Indien, 1977

Principal individual shows 
 1988 : Gérard Garouste at the Musée national d'art moderne in Paris
 2001 : Ellipse at the Fondation Cartier
 2002 : Kézive ou la ville mensonge, Daniel Templon Gallery
 2003 : Saintes ellipses at the Chapelle de la Salpêtrière
 2004 : Portraits, Galerie Daniel Templon, Paris
 2005 : La Coupole at the Panthéon
 2006 : L'Anesse et la Figue, Daniel Templon Gallery, Paris
 2008 : La Bourgogne, la famille et l'eau tiède, Daniel Templon Gallery, Paris
 2012 : Walpurgisnacht, Daniel Templon Gallery, Paris
 2014 : Ineffable Tales, Daniel Templon Gallery, Paris
 2022 : Gérard Garouste at the Centre_Pompidou, Paris

Decorations 
 Officer of the Legion of Honour (2015)

References

External links 
  Site officiel de l'association La Source
  Gérard Garouste

20th-century French painters
20th-century French male artists
French male painters
21st-century French painters
21st-century French male artists
20th-century French sculptors
21st-century French sculptors
20th-century French engravers
Painters from Paris
1946 births
Living people
Officiers of the Légion d'honneur
Commandeurs of the Ordre des Arts et des Lettres
Commanders of the Ordre national du Mérite